Sultan Nour (Japanese: スルタン・ヌール, ヌール・エルディン・スルタン, スルタン　ヌールエルディンヤシーンアブドエルレヒム ; born 20 August 1971) is a Japanese politician.

He is the first Arab Muslim local member of the assembly in Japan.

Personal life 
Sultan Nour was born in Aleppo, Syria. He started learning karate at 4 and started to gain interest in Japan. At 12, he moved to Egypt. He graduated from a sports university, and became a national public officer in Egypt.

In 2001, he moved to Japan and in 2013, he became a Japanese citizen.

He married a Syrian woman in 2016, then moved to Shōnai, Yamagata. He has a son, Yashin (Japanese: 矢進) and a daughter, Sana (Japanese: 彩菜). He got elected town council member of Shōnai on 18 July 2021.

References

Japanese people of Syrian descent
Japanese political people
Japanese people of Arab descent
1971 births
Living people
Governors of Yamagata Prefecture